
Nordeste is Portuguese for 'northeast' and may refer to:

Places

Brazil
Nordeste, the Northeast Region of Brazil
Nordeste (socio-geographic division), a socio-geographic division of this region

Portugal
Nordeste (Azores), a municipality on the island of São Miguel

Other
Nordeste Linhas Aéreas Regionais, an airline based in Salvador, Bahia, Brazil.
Nordeste (film), a 2005 Argentine film